The Symphony is an orchestral composition in four movements by the American composer Christopher Theofanidis.  It was commissioned by the Atlanta Symphony Orchestra, which premiered the work under the conductor Robert Spano in April 2009.  The piece is dedicated to Robert Spano "in admiration and friendship."

Composition
The Symphony has a duration of roughly 35 minutes and is composed in four numbered movements.  The first movement has a duration of roughly 12 minutes; in the program notes, Theofanidis described it and the fourth movement as "the big pillars of the piece, both emotionally and in scale."  The second movement has a duration of roughly 8 minutes and was described by the composer as "quite lyrical, but not slow."  The third movement is a brief scherzo-ritornello with a duration of only about 4 minutes.  The final movement has a duration of roughly 10 minutes; the composer described its relation to the opening movement, writing:

Reception
Reviewing a 2011 recording of the Symphony, Jeff Dunn of the San Francisco Classical Voice wrote, "Listeners will find [Theofanidis's] Texas toast of a Symphony No. 1 an instantly engaging experience."  He added, "Throughout, the music will keep you upright in your seat and as happy as if you'd just watched another Bourne Identity action flick. Whether you'll want to immerse yourself in further hearings, however, is a matter of taste."  Pierre Ruhe of ArtsATL opined, "There's much to admire, from its earnestness and craftsmanship to its engagement with a large canvas. Theofanidis' symphony takes a Mahlerian view that the orchestra can express everything, which is filtered through symphonic Hollywood, from John Williams to Tan Dun, with a heavy use (or overuse) of percussion for grandiose effect."  Joshua Kosman of the San Francisco Chronicle also praised the work, writing:

Recording
A recording of the symphony, performed by Robert Spano and the Atlanta Symphony Orchestra, was released through the orchestra's label ASO Media on June 28, 2011.

References

Compositions by Christopher Theofanidis
2009 compositions
Theofanidis 1
Music commissioned by the Atlanta Symphony Orchestra